Józefów Witowicki is a colony in the administrative district of Gmina Bogoria, within Staszów County, Świętokrzyskie Voivodeship, in south-central Poland.

The village has a population of  129.

Demography 
According to the 2002 Poland census, there were 132 people residing in Józefów Witowicki village, of whom 47.7% were male and 52.3% were female. In the village, the population was spread out, with 31.1% under the age of 18, 37.9% from 18 to 44, 13.6% from 45 to 64, and 17.4% who were 65 years of age or older.
 Figure 1. Population pyramid of village in 2002 – by age group and sex

References

Villages in Staszów County